Chamita is a census-designated place in Rio Arriba County, New Mexico, United States. Its population was 870 as of the 2010 census. New Mexico State Road 74 passes through the community. During its earlier years, the community was known as San Pedro De Chamita and served as the first county seat for Rio Arriba county.

Geography
Both the Rio Grande and the Rio Chama flow through the community. The two rivers converge south of the area.

Demographics

Education
It is in Española Public Schools. The comprehensive public high school is Española Valley High School.

See also

 List of census-designated places in New Mexico

References

External links

Census-designated places in New Mexico
Census-designated places in Rio Arriba County, New Mexico